Africa Hitech is an electronic music project consisting of Mark Pritchard and Steve Spacek. They released their first EP Blen in April 2010 and a second, Hitecherous, in June 2010. Their debut album 93 Million Miles was released in May 2011.

Reception
Pitchfork gave 93 Million Miles a review of 8.2, writing "It's no small feat to craft something this adventurous and eclectic and still have it turn out to share the cohesion of a DJ mix, but Africa Hitech manage just that-- and despite all the left turns, you want to stick by their side every step of the way".

Discography

Albums
 93 Million Miles (Warp, 2011)

EPs
 2010: Blen (Warp, 2010)
 2010: Hitecherous (Warp, 2010)
 2011: Out in the Streets (VIP) (Warp, 2011)
 2011: Do U Really Wanna Fight (Warp, 2011)

References

External links
  Video Interview] Steve Spacek and Mark Pritchard discuss music production
 https://africahitech.com/

British electronic music groups
Warp (record label) artists